Carlo de Leeuw (12 December 1960 – 13 February 2020) was a Dutch footballer.

Club career
A talented forward, De Leeuw came through the youth system of hometown club Feyenoord and made his professional debut for them against Excelsior on 23 September 1979. He won a penalty and scored one of their goals in the 1980 Cup final against eternal rivals Ajax. After four years he joined city rivals Excelsior for whom he had two different spells. He made his debut for them on 22 August 1982 against his former club Feyenoord. He scored 25 goals in 184 league and cup games for Cambuur between 1983 and 1989 and was voted best Cambuur midfielder of all-time in 2007. He played another 88 games for FC Eindhoven between 1989 and 1993 and had a season at FC Volendam for whom he played 22 matches in the 1991–92 season.

After being released by Eindhoven, he had a spell at amateur side Witgoor Dessel in Belgium.

International career
He played 7 games for the Netherlands U-19 team, scoring 2 goals, between July 1978 and April 1979.

Later years
After retiring as a player, he became kit man at Feyenoord and the national team in 2002.

Personal life
In summer 2019, de Leeuw was diagnosed with tongue cancer and he died on 13 February 2020. He was survived by his wife Charlotte and their two daughters.

Honours
KNVB Cup: 1
 1980

References

External links
 In memoriam: Carlo de Leeuw (59)(Bio) - Feyenoord 
 Profile - Feyenoord-Online
 Kind van de Kuip: Carlo de Leeuw, de stille kracht van Feyenoord én Oranje - Panorama 

1960 births
2020 deaths
Footballers from Rotterdam
Association football wingers
Dutch footballers
Feyenoord players
Excelsior Rotterdam players
SC Cambuur players
FC Eindhoven players
FC Volendam players
Eredivisie players
Eerste Divisie players
Feyenoord non-playing staff
Deaths from cancer in the Netherlands
Deaths from oral cancer
Netherlands youth international footballers